The Jadeite Cabbage or Jadeite Cabbage with Insects is a piece of jadeite carved into the shape of a Chinese cabbage head, and with a locust and katydid camouflaged in the leaves. It is part of the collection of the National Palace Museum in Taipei, Taiwan.

Despite its popularity with museum-goers and frequent misrepresentation as a national treasure, it is only designated as a significant antiquity, having less rarity and value than required for categorization as a national treasure under the Cultural Heritage Preservation Act. For example, the Jadeite Cabbage has been called the "most famous masterpiece" of the entire National Palace Museum, and along with the Meat-shaped Stone and the Mao Gong Ding, is today called one of the Three Treasures of the National Palace Museum, a redesignation from several less accessible, infrequently-displayed works. It has also been chosen by the public as the most important item in the museum's entire collection.

Description
The Jadeite Cabbage is a small sculpture.

The ruffled semi-translucent appearance of the leaves is due to the combination of various natural colors of the jade to recreate the color variations of a real cabbage.  The figure was carved from a single piece of half-white, half-green jadeite which contained numerous imperfections such as cracks and discolored blotches. These flaws were incorporated into the sculpture and became the veins in the cabbage's stalks and leaves.

The sculpture has been considered an allegory of female virtue with the white stalk symbolizing purity, the leaves denoting fertility and abundance and locust and katydid representing children. However, further studies have proven that this interpretation is incorrect with regard to the katydid. There is a poem about an insect "zhongsi" in the Book of Poetry. This insect has been used metaphorically as an auspicious symbol for having many children and grandchildren in Chinese culture. Based on the interpretations of this poem and entomological analyses, this "zhongsi" is very likely a migratory locust.  The locust on the Jadeite Cabbage is too small to be positively identified as a migratory locust. However, this "katydid" is definitely a Chinese bush cricket (Gampsocleis gratiosa) which is not the "zhongsi" of the Book of Poetry. In fact, the Chinese bush cricket is a singing insect artificially raised and used during the Qing Dynasty to entertain guests at the palace banquet. Consequently, this insect cannot be used as a fertility symbol.

History
The sculptor of the Jadeite Cabbage is unknown.  It was first displayed in the Forbidden City's Yonghe Palace, the residence of the Qing Empire's Guangxu Emperor's Consort Jin, who probably received it as part of her dowry for her wedding to Guangxu in 1889. Following the fall of the Qing Empire in the Chinese Revolution of 1911, the sculpture became part of the collection of the Palace Museum in the Forbidden City.  Along with a core of that collection, the piece survived the Second Sino-Japanese War (World War II) and the Chinese Civil War and was eventually relocated to Taiwan's National Palace Museum.

References

External links
Jadeite Cabbage with Insects at the National Palace Museum website
Leslie Hook. "The Jade Cabbage" Wall Street Journal. 27 July 2007.

Chinese sculpture
National Palace Museum
Qing dynasty art
19th-century sculptures
Jade
Individual hardstone carvings